ExWhyZ, stylized as ExWHYZ, is a Japanese alternative idol girl group formed by WACK in 2022. The group is made up of former members of Empire.

History

2022–present: Formation and XYZ 
All members of ExWhyZ were originally members of Empire. ExWhyZ released their debut album, XYZ, through EMI Records on November 2, 2022. From November 2022 to January 2023 the group embarked on their first tour. XYZ was re-released on March 1, 2023, as XYZ [Hyper Edition], consisting of all of the original songs from the regular album but re-arranged to include vocals from Midoriko who was on hiatus at the time of the initial album recording and one new track. In April, they will embark on their second tour.

Members
Yu-ki
Mayu
Midoriko
Maho
Mikina
Now

Discography

Studio albums

Reissues

Singles

Concerts and tours

Tours
 ExWhyZ First Tour XYZ (2022–2023)
 ExWhyZ Tour 2023 Xanadu (2023)

References

Japanese idol groups
Japanese pop music groups
Musical groups established in 2022
Musical groups from Tokyo
2022 establishments in Japan